Donald Goodson (15 October 1932 – 13 September 2010) was an English cricketer. He was a right-handed batsman and a right-arm medium-pace bowler who played first-class cricket for Leicestershire between 1950 and 1953. He was born in Eastwell, Leicestershire and died at Cape Town, South Africa.

Goodson played as an amateur player in a single first-class match for Leicestershire in 1950, scoring just one run in two innings and failing to take a wicket. He reappeared in eight games in the middle of the 1953 season, but again had very little success.

In 1957, Goodson took five wickets in an innings in a rain-hit non-first-class inter-service match while playing for the Army. This encouraged Leicestershire, which by that time had a second eleven playing in the Minor Counties Championship, to give him a further trial, but although he played regularly for the second team across 1958, he did not reappear in first-class cricket, and the 1953 matches were his last.

References

1932 births
2010 deaths
English cricketers
Leicestershire cricketers